Voznesensky is a rural locality (a khutor) in Yuldybayevsky Selsoviet, Zilairsky District, Bashkortostan, Russia. The population was 17 as of 2010. There is 1 street.

Geography 
Voznesensky is located 61 km east of Zilair (the district's administrative centre) by road. Yaparsaz is the nearest rural locality.

References 

Rural localities in Zilairsky District